Boulengerula changamwensis, the  Changamwe caecilian, is a species of amphibian in the family Herpelidae. It is also known as Changamwensis African caecilian and Changamwe lowland caecilian. It is found in southern Kenya (Changamwe and the Shimba Hills) and Malawi, and possibly in the intervening Tanzania and Mozambique.

It is threatened by habitat loss for deforestation and collecting of firewood, agriculture and farming, herbicides and pesticides and expanding human settlement. It is protected by the Shimba Hills and parts of Shire Highlands but its protection in Kaya Forest may also be threatened by the deforestation and collecting of firewood.

References

amphibians described in 1932
amphibians of Kenya
changamwensis
Amphibians of Malawi
taxonomy articles created by Polbot